Yuragawa Dam  is a gravity dam located in Kyoto Prefecture in Japan. The dam is used for power production. The catchment area of the dam is 595 km2. The dam impounds about 19  ha of land when full and can store 958 thousand cubic meters of water. The construction of the dam was started on 1922 and completed in 1924.

See also
List of dams in Japan

References

Dams in Kyoto Prefecture